Roulette Girl is the second album by Mary Prankster.

Track listing
All songs by Mary Prankster
 "Roulette Girl" – 3:36
 "The Bottle's Talking Now" – 1:57
 "The World Is Full of Bastards" – 1:54
 "Swan Dive" – 2:47
 "Rational Bohemian" – 2:39
 "Mata Hari" – 1:59
 "Punk Rock Heaven" – 1:37
 "Tempest" – 2:08
 "Takes His Place" – 4:21
 "New Tricks" – 2:52

Personnel
 Mary Prankster – vocals, guitar
 Jon E. Cakes – bass guitar on all tracks, acoustic guitar on "New Tricks"
 Phil Tang – drums
 Rennie Grant – lead guitar, additional rhythm guitar
 Jimmi Sexton – guitar solo on "Roulette Girl"
 Allyson Daniels – gospel vocals and arrangement
 Marcella Daniel – gospel vocals
 Wenona R. Daniel – gospel vocals
 Ursula Encarnacion – string arrangement, cello
 Raili Haimila – viola
 Jenny Takamatsu – violin
 Larry "The Horn" Williams – french horn
 Elisa Koehler – horn arrangement, trumpet
 Matt Belzer – clarinet

Mary Prankster albums
1999 albums
Fowl Records albums